A House in Bayswater is a 1959 British television documentary directed by Ken Russell. It was his first BBC film not made for the Monitor series.

Outline
A portrait of a five-storey Victorian house in Bayswater, London, and of the people who live there.

The half-hour film was recently selected by Simon Jenkins to appear in the BBC 4 Collections archive on BBC iPlayer.

References

External links

A House in Bayswater (1960), BBC website
A house in Bayswater at Dangerous Minds
A House in Bayswater at BFI
A House in Bayswater at BFI Screenonline

1959 in British television
British short documentary films
British black-and-white films
1950s short documentary films
1950s English-language films
Films directed by Ken Russell